Qiaowan Station is a station on Line 7 of the Beijing Subway.

First & Last Time
Beijing West Railway Station — Hua Zhuang
The first train 5:45
The last train 23:30
Hua Zhuang — Beijing West Railway Station
The first train 5:37
The last train 22:52

Station Layout 
The station has an underground island platform.

Exits 
There are 3 exits, lettered B, C, and D. Exit D is accessible.

References

Railway stations in China opened in 2014
Beijing Subway stations in Dongcheng District